He Jun (born  in Heilongjiang) is a Chinese wheelchair curler.

He participated in the 2014 Winter Paralympics where Chinese team finished on fourth place.

Teams

References

External links 

Profile at the official website for the 2014 Winter Paralympics
 Video: 

Living people
1986 births
Sportspeople from Heilongjiang
Chinese male curlers
Chinese wheelchair curlers
Paralympic wheelchair curlers of China
Wheelchair curlers at the 2014 Winter Paralympics
21st-century Chinese people